The women's hammer throw at the 2010 African Championships in Athletics was held on July 28.

Results

External links
Results

Hammer
Hammer throw at the African Championships in Athletics
2010 in women's athletics